Peter Emil Steen (1828 – 1884) was a Norwegian ship-owner and businessperson.

He was a son of merchant Daniel Steen in Laurvig. He is best known as the founder of Steen & Strøm in 1856 together with Samuel Strøm, Jr., as a continuation of Strøm's business which had roots back to 1797. Steen has worked in this company since 1847. When Samuel Strøm died in 1876, Emil Steen brought the widow Augusta Strøm on board as partner. The company was also involved in shipping during this period.

Together with Ovidia Laurenze Jebe (1829–1905) Emil Steen had the son Johan Steen, Christian Steen and Emil Steen. The next generation took over Steen & Strøm in 1884, with Johan Steen, Christian Steen and Christian Strøm, Jr. as the three partners. In turn, Johan had the son Erling who became a partner in 1914.

References

1828 births
1884 deaths
Norwegian businesspeople in shipping
Norwegian businesspeople in retailing